Tomasz Jabłoński (born 29 December 1988) is a Polish boxer. He competed in the men's middleweight event at the 2016 Summer Olympics.

References

External links
 
 
 
 
 

1988 births
Living people
Polish male boxers
Olympic boxers of Poland
Boxers at the 2016 Summer Olympics
Sportspeople from Gdynia
Middleweight boxers
20th-century Polish people
21st-century Polish people